Shyamlal is a given name. People with that name include:

Shyamlal Gupta, Indian poet and lyricist.
Shyamal Sinha (Shyamlal Sinha), Indian cricketer
Shyamlal Yadav,  Indian politician